"Stronger Woman" is a song written by Marv Green and co-written and recorded by American recording artist Jewel. Her first release to country radio, it is also the first single from her album Perfectly Clear (2008), which was produced by John Rich of the country duo Big & Rich and released on the Valory imprint of Big Machine Records. "Stronger Woman" reached number 13 on both the Billboard Country Airplay and Hot Country Songs charts respectively. It also peaked at number 84 on the Hot 100 chart.

The single was released to iTunes exclusively on February 5, and officially sent to US radio on February 11, 2008. In late January, in its first week of unofficial release, Stronger Woman entered the  Billboard Hot Country Songs chart at number 50.

Critical reception
AllMusic's Stephen Thomas Erlewine chose it as a highlight from Perfectly Clear. Mandi Bierly of Entertainment Weekly called it "unremarkable radio fare."

Music video
The video was filmed in Nashville, and on March 9, 2008 it made its debut on PerezHilton.com.

Chart performance
On the week of February 23, 2008, "Stronger Woman" debuted at number 96 on the Billboard Hot 100, but left the next week. It reappeared on the week of April 5 at number 93, and peaked at number 84 the week of April 19, staying on the chart for ten weeks.

Year-end charts

References

2008 singles
2008 songs
Jewel (singer) songs
Songs written by Jewel (singer)
Songs written by Marv Green
Big Machine Records singles
Music videos directed by Trey Fanjoy
Song recordings produced by John Rich